139 Juewa  is a very large and dark main belt asteroid. It is probably composed of primitive carbonaceous material. It was the first asteroid discovered from China.

Juewa was discovered from Beijing by the visiting American astronomer James Craig Watson on 10 October 1874; Watson was in China to observe the transit of Venus. Watson asked Prince Gong to name the asteroid. Gong's choice was 瑞華星 (roughly, "Star of China’s Fortune"). Watson used the first two characters ('star' being redundant), transliterating them Juewa in Wade–Giles convention of the time. (In pinyin, 瑞華 is transliterated ruìhuá.)

Since 1988 there have been 8 reported stellar occultations by Juewa. From the occultation on 31 August 2013 the best fit ellipse measures 148.3+/-4.3 km x 142.3 +/- 15.6 km.

13-cm radar observations of this asteroid from the Arecibo Observatory between 1980 and 1985 were used to produce a diameter estimate of 172 km. Based upon radar data, the near surface solid density of the asteroid is
1.5.

References

External links 
 
 

000139
Discoveries by James Craig Watson
Named minor planets
000139
000139
000139
18741010